is a Japanese voice actress associated with 81 Produce. She has voiced starring characters in many anime shows, including: Astolfo in Fate/Apocrypha, Ako Shirabe/Cure Muse in Suite PreCure,  Suguri Kinoshita in Happy Kappy,  Chinatsu Yoshikawa in YuruYuri, Tsumiki Miniwa in Place to Place, Yuzuko Nonohara in Yuyushiki,  Mia Ageha  in Pretty Rhythm: Dear My Future, Emilia Hermit in Hundred, Hinako Saijō in Long Riders!, and Kotetsu in Tsugumomo.  At the 7th Seiyu Awards, she won an award for Best Female Newcomer.

Filmography

Anime

Film

Drama CDs

Video games

References

External links
  
 Official agency profile 
 
 

1989 births
Living people
Japanese video game actresses
Japanese voice actresses
Voice actresses from Ehime Prefecture
Voice actresses from Saitama (city)
81 Produce voice actors